Ljungby is the central locality of Ljungby Municipality, Kronoberg County, Sweden, with 15,785 inhabitants in 2015.

Ljungby was instituted in 1829 as a köping, or market town, and did not become a municipality of its own when the first local government acts took effect in 1863, but retained part of the surrounding rural municipality of the same name. In 1936 Ljungby got the title stad, Swedish for Town or City. Since 1971 Ljungby is the seat of Ljungby Municipality.

Much of the town center was destroyed in the city fire of 1953. At the time of the rebuilding, the modern style used, characterized by among other Hotel Terazza, still remains controversial locally.

History 

The first known inhabitant of the area that is today's Ljungby was Astrad, as can be read on the runestone Replösastenen from the 11th century located a couple of kilometers from the city center. The runestone says: "Götrad made this stone after Astrad, the foremost of kinsmen and yeomen (Swedish:odalmän) who in Finnveden formerly lived". In 1952 a statue by John Lundqvist was erected near the main plaza depicting Astrad and Götrad. But there were other people living around Ljungby long before Astrad and Götrad as evident by the numerous burial mounds in the area. One of the largest burial mounds lies close to the water tower and is named Kungshögen. The largest burial is however Höga rör that lies some kilometers south of Ljungby on the slope of the Lagan river valley.

In the 12th century the first stone church was built with the formation of the parish Ljungby socken. Ljungby had for a long time been the crossroad where the two important north–south and east–west trade routes met. Because of this a hostelry was built adjacent to the Laganstigen in the 14th century by royal decree.

In 1828 Ljungby only consisted of five farms. It was in the beginning of the 19th century the need for a city in Sunnerbo hundred was raised. Ljungby competed with the village Berga, where bishop Henrik had obtained permission to found a city. As Ljungby was considered to be located more central in the hundred and had better road connections, the choice fell on the latter option.

According to a royal letter from October 15, 1828, Ljungby was made a friköping with regulations on March 28, 1829, according to three sources, and on January 1, 1830, according to another. Ljungby was founded mostly on property that was donated by Märta Ljungberg, operator of Ljungby's hostelry. A town plan with perpendicular roads was used as base when the town's buildings was planned. The city plan would later be split with the arrival of the railroad. In 1878 the railroad between Vislanda and Bolmen, via Ljungby, was opened. The railroad would later be linked with Karlshamn–Vislanda–Bolmens railroad (KVBJ) and Halmstad–Bolmen Railroad (HBJ). In 1899 the north–south stretch Skåne–Smålands Railroad (SSJ) was opened.

During the 20th century the town expanded with the help of the workshop and wood industry.

The first population boom started at the end of the 1940s and culminated in the 1960s. Luckily this coincided with the increased need of work by the growing industry in the urban area with the need of work decreasing in the rural areas. The growth was also supported by the labor immigration that began in the post-war period.

The town centre fire of 1953
During the night between 4 and 5 July 1953 a fire started at Gustaf Svenssons Bilverkstad (English: Gustaf Svensson's Garage) by the street Eskilsgatan at block Stjärnan. The garage was a wooden building with cans of petrol and oil on the floor. First on site was Ljungby fire department, no more than five minutes after the alarm, and could confirm that the fire had started at the garage. Once the fire had taken hold it continued to spread eastward towards the other wooden buildings in block Stjärnan. The fire department had hoped that the street Föreningsgatan would work as a fire road, but the wind brought with it sparks and flames, and soon stood parts of block Kometen also ablaze.

Next to block Kometen, by the street Kungsgatan, lied Ljungby's Telegraph and Telephone Station, who tried to protect themself behind suspended soaked cloths. The nightstaff could not handle the increased traffic pressure the fire had brought with it and had to call in additional staff, who also had to evacuate archives and machines from the building. The Telegraph and Telephone Station survived the fire after the firefighters managed to extinguished it with foam.

In an attempt to gain control over the fire Ljungby called on reinforcement from Hamneda, Angelstad, Ryssby, Växjö, Älmhult, and Strömsnäsbruk. Police from Växjö were also called in to support Ljungby's police force with directing traffic and to prevent people from entering the scene of fire. Due to an error the fire department from Lagan were not summoned. The fire departments' efforts were weakened as only one of the pumps at Ljungby water plant was in operation. The activation of the second pump was delayed as the regular mechanic was on vacation and the subsitiunual mechanic had troubles getting the machinery started. Despite the activation of both pumps at the water plant there were still not enough water to put out the fires. The fire departments had to activate the river pump by Lagan River and pump in untreated raw water into Ljungby's water supply. A wagon with water pipes from the civil defence were also requisitioned. The pipes were laid from the river all the way to the city centre and gave water to five fire hoses. It is said that the pipe ended at the square basin by the statue of Astrad and Götrad.

Aftermath
During the days after the fire it was concluded that  floor space had been destroyed and that twenty buildings had been affected by the fire; whereof 28 residential flats, 24 business flats, 12 workshops, and 9 warehouses. Most of the buildings where from the days when Ljungby was just a market town, built before 1936. Thirty families became homeless and 96 people became unemployed. It was estimated that a value of three million kronor had been destroyed by the fire. No person was killed, but seven firefighters had to visit Ljungby hospital; six of them could leave shortly thereafter and one had to stay.

As untreated raw water had been pumped in into Ljungby's water supply network from the Lagan River the Health Department issued a request for everyone to boil their water before using it. This was particularly important as there was a high risk that sewage water had entered the water supply and as the deadly salmonella outbreak The Alvesta Epidemic had recently reached its peak.

There were rumours that looting had occurred during the fire. However, no reports were received and according to police and firefighters on site all went well, apart for some drunk people who disturbed.

There were plans to build huts on the square so that the affected businesses could continue their trade while rebuilding. But many business continued their trade at other temporary premises, which was noticed as only 15 out of the 96 unemployed reported to the Employment Service the following days.

The reconstruction of the city centre consisted of buildings and a piazza in a more modern international style. This style is particularly evident in the seven-storey hotel Terraza which replaced the four-story hotel Stadshotellet. The plan was to demolish Stadshotellet in the spring of 1961, but instead it burned down on December 18, 1960.

Administration 
Ljungby became a friköping (or chipping in English) October 15, 1828, with the regulations decided on March 28, 1829. On January 31, 1879, Ljungby chipping's rules and regulations, building bylaws, and the fire charter was issued. On February 10, 1893, it was decided that the health care charter would also apply in the chipping. 1900 the concept municipalsamhälle was introduced into Sweden's legislation and Ljungby chipping was transformed into Ljungby köping municipalsamhälle. This was due to the fact that at least one of the town's charters was applied to the area and didn't belong to a stadskommun (approx. town municipality) or köpingskommun (approx. chipping municipality). On July 3, 1902, a special arrangement Charter was issued for Ljungby köping municipalsamhälle. On October 7, 1921, the area of Ljungby municipalsamhälle was increased from 0.98 km2 (0.37 mi2) to 3.50 km2 (1.35 mi2).

Ljungby was, and is, the "church village" of Ljungby parish and belonged to Ljungby rural municipality after 1862 Swedish municipal reform. On January 1, 1936, Ljungby parish and rural municipality was reformed into Ljungby stad. This was in accordance to a decision made on September 20, 1935, that gave ljungby the title "stad" (English: town or city). With 1971 Swedish municipal reforms Ljungby stad and the rural municipality was ascended into Ljungby municipality with Ljungby being the central locality.

Transport

Ljungby has good road connections as it lies where the E4 and national road 25 intersects. The town is also pierced by the scenic route Riksettan.

Ljungby has a small airport, Ljungby-Feringe airport, without regular services about 13 kilometers to the northeast. The airport is owned by Feringe Flygklubb and is mostly used by sports planes, gliders, and parachutists. The closest airport with passenger traffic is Växjö Småland Airport.

There were earlier railroad connections in four directions with narrow-gauge railways towards Halmstad and Vislanda, and standard gauge towards Värnamo and Markaryd. These lines are now defunct and the tracks have been removed.

Most of the railway embankments have been converted into bicycle paths. The northerly embankment connects Ljungby and Lagan with a 10 kilometer asphalted bicycle path where it connects with the bicycle route Sverigeleden. The west-eastern embankment is part of the 250 kilometer long bike trail Banvallsleden.

Business and education

Among the industries in Ljungby there are Svetruck, Electrolux Laundry Systems, Strålfors, Ljungby Maskin, CTC Enertech, HP Tronic and LL-Skogsmaskiner. Ljungby is also home to the daily regional newspaper Smålänningen. There are also several smaller and niche companies located in Ljungby.

The Ljungby library was designed by Jan Wallinder and finished construction in 1982.

Gymnasium
There are two gymnasiums in Ljungby municipality; Sunnerbogymnasiet and Ryssbygymnasiet.

Sunnerbogymnasiet is the largest with about 1'300 students and offers education in Social Science, Natural Science, Engineering, Construction, Aesthetics, Handicraft, and Business and Administration.

Ryssbygymnasiet lies about 30 kilometers outside Ljungby in the small village Ryssby. It offers education in Hotel, restaurant and catering, Hunting and wildlife management, Nature and adventure tourism, and Forestry.

College
Since 2002 there is a small college in Ljungby, Centre for Information Logistic and Högskolecentrum Ljungby, in cooperation with Linnaeus University, Jönköping University, and Halmstad University. The college offers a variety of programs and courses in the three areas of information logistics, marketing and sales, and product development.

Culture

Ljungby have been the home of several different cultural personalities. Among others, the cinematographer Gunnar Fischer and the writers Folke Fridell, Lennart Williams, and Sölve Rydell.

The Ljungberg Museum is since 2012 Kronoberg County's official museum of visual art. The museum's permanent exhibition feature Sven Ljungberg and Ann Margret Dahlquist-Ljungberg's artistic achievements. They do also have continuously special exhibitions with other major Swedish and Nordic artists.

The internationally renowned painter Erik Ortvad had his home during the second half of his life in Kvänjarp just outside Ljungby. The painter and sculptor Albert von Stockenström lived and died in Ljungby. Current painter Kenneth Sjöö live in Ljungby.

The Museum of Legends is a small museum dedicated to oral storytelling, fairy tales and folklore. The museum is run by the UNESCO accredited advisorStorytelling Network Kronoberg who also arrange the yearly Ljungby Storytelling Festival.

Churches and religious communities

Church of Sweden

Ljungby församling
Ljungby assembly belongs to Ljungby parish in the diocese of Växjö. The congregation was formed in the Middle Ages with their first stone church being built in the 12th century. Ljungby assembly's current church, Ljungby Church, was built between 1858–1859 and inaugurated on September 8, 1861, by bishop Henrik Gustaf Hultman.

The newly built church had a bit of an austere interior, with the only inventory from the old demolished stone church being the middle aged baptismal font and the 18th century longcase clock. The church does however have a few recent artistic embellishments. One of the most eye-catching objects being the gilded altarpiece by Sven Ljungberg featuring Christ's way on via Dolorosa.

Ljungby Maria Församling
Ljungby Maria assembly belongs to Ljungby parish. The assembly was created when Ljungby assembly was split in 2002. The church Mariakyrkan was designed by architect Agneta Holmqvist and opened in 2001 to be the new assembly's main church.

Annelundkyrkan
Annelundkyrkan operates as the district church for Ljungby's Annelund district and as a funeral church as it is located at the Skogskyrkogården cemetery. The church was designed by county architect Hans Lindén and opened on July 2, 1972. The church is decorated by Åke Wremp and woodcarver Eva Spångberg. The church does also have a rich mural by Sven Ljungberg.

Other
Churches and communities that belongs to other religious communities:
 Pingstkyrkan i Ljungby
 Betelkyrkan EFK
 Missionskyrkan
 Sankt Stefans katolska kapell
 Markuskyrkan, LBK
 Allianskyrkan

Sport
The most well-known sports clubs of Ljungby are the ice hockey club IF Troja/Ljungby, the soccer club Ljungby IF, and the volleyball club Ljungby VBK

Famous people from Ljungby

 Bengt Harding Olson, prosecutor and politician (fp)
 Eskil Erlandsson, MP, and Minister for Rural Affairs (c)
 Ingvar Kamprad, active in Elmtaryd, business leader, founder of IKEA
 John Ljunggren; former head bartender at Operabaren and author of Europe's first cocktail book "Recept å bardrinkar" from 1917.
 Märta Ljungberg, innkeeper and donor
 Rune B. Johansson, Minister (government) and politician (s)
 Vera Sandberg, Sweden's first female engineer

Art and Culture 
 Folke Fridell, Berga parish; proletarian writer
 Gunnar Fischer, cinematographer, director, and writer
 Sven Ljungberg, painter, graphic artist, professor, and writer

Sport 
 Emil Krafth, soccer player for Newcastle United of the English Premier League
 Jacob Larsson, ice hockey player for the Anaheim Ducks of the NHL
 Linus Johansson, ice hockey player for HC Sochi of the KHL
 Mattias Nilsson, ice hockey player for the Sparta Warriors of the GET-ligaen
 Mattias Weinhandl, former professional ice hockey player
 Oscar Fantenberg, ice hockey player for the Vancouver Canucks of the NHL
 Pierre Engvall, ice hockey player for the New York Islanders of the NHL
 Rade Prica, former professional soccer player
 Roger Johansson, former professional ice hockey player

Demographic

Climate
Ljungby has a transitional maritime (Cfb) and humid continental climate (Dfb) influenced by its inland position, with large temperature differences between seasons. Most winter precipitation is cold rain, an effect of mild weather being associated with low pressure systems arriving from the North Sea in a westerly direction. Summers have some of the strongest hypothetical heat potential in Sweden, being inland at a low latitude. However, the same type of westerlies often bring in moist and cool air instead leading to clouds, convection and heavy rainfall. This renders seaside locations on the west coast having similar summer afternoon temperatures as Ljungby.

References

External links

 Ljungby Municipality - Official site

Populated places in Kronoberg County
Populated places in Ljungby Municipality
Municipal seats of Kronoberg County
Swedish municipal seats
Market towns in Sweden
Finnveden